Global democracy may lie in the scope of:
 Cosmopolitan democracy, a project of normative political theory which explores the application of norms and values of democracy at different levels, from global to local
 Democratic mundialization, one of the movements aiming at democratic globalization, the concept of an institutional system of global democracy that would give world citizens a say in world organizations.